Jad Demian is a Lebanese young politician. Head of the Lebanese Forces  Youth Association.

References

Lebanese politicians
Year of birth missing (living people)
Living people
Place of birth missing (living people)